is a passenger railway station located in Kanagawa-ku, Yokohama, Kanagawa Prefecture, Japan, operated by the East Japan Railway Company (JR East).

Lines
Shin-Koyasu Station is served by the Keihin-Tōhoku Line and the Yokohama Line.

Station layout 
The station consists of one elevated island platform serving two tracks, with the station building underneath. The station is staffed.

Platforms

History
The station opened on 11 November 1943.

Passenger statistics
In fiscal 2019, the station was used by an average of 23,894 passengers daily (boarding passengers only).

The passenger figures (boarding passengers only) for previous years are as shown below.

Surrounding area
Keikyū Shinkoyasu Station

See also
 List of railway stations in Japan

References

External links

 

Railway stations in Kanagawa Prefecture
Railway stations in Japan opened in 1943
Keihin-Tōhoku Line
Railway stations in Yokohama